A public data network (PDN) is a network established and operated by a telecommunications administration, or a recognized private operating agency, for the specific purpose of providing data transmission services for the public.

The first public packet switching network, RETD, was deployed in 1972 in Spain. "Public data network" was the common name given to the collection of X.25 providers, the first of which was DATAPAC in 1976. The International Packet Switched Service became the first commercial and international packet-switched network in 1978. Their combined networks had large global coverage during the 1980s and into the 1990s. These networks later provided the infrastructure for the early Internet.

Description 

In communications, a PDN is a circuit- or packet-switched network that is available to the public and that can transmit data in digital form. A PDN provider is a company that provides access to a PDN and that provides any of X.25, Frame Relay, or cell relay (ATM) services. Access to a PDN generally includes a guaranteed bandwidth, known as the committed information rate (CIR). Costs for the access depend on the guaranteed rate. PDN providers differ in how they charge for temporary increases in required bandwidth (known as surges). Some use the amount of overrun; others use the surge duration.

History 

Experimental packet switching networks preceded the first public data networks which came into operation in the 1970s. Early examples include: RETD/Iberpac in Spain, which was the first PDN in 1972; RCP/Transpac in France; Telenet, Tymnet and CompuServe in the United States; EPSS/Packet Switch Stream, in the United Kingdom; EIN/Euronet in the EEC; DATAPAC in Canada, which was the first PDN to use X.25; and AUSTPAC in Australia.

The International Packet Switched Service was the first commercial and international packet-switched network. It was a collaboration between British and American telecom companies that became operational in 1978.

These networks later adopted TCP/IP and provided the infrastructure for the early Internet.

Public switched data network
A public switched data network (PSDN) is a network for providing data services via a system of multiple wide area networks, similar in concept to the public switched telephone network (PSTN). A PSDN may use a variety of switching technologies, including packet switching, circuit switching, and message switching. A packet-switched PSDN may also be called a packet-switched data network.

Originally the term PSDN referred only to Packet Switch Stream (PSS), an X.25-based packet-switched network, mostly used to provide leased-line connections between local area networks and the Internet using  permanent virtual circuits (PVCs). Today, the term may refer not only to Frame Relay and Asynchronous Transfer Mode (ATM), both providing PVCs, but also to Internet Protocol (IP), GPRS, and other packet-switching techniques.

Whilst there are several technologies that are superficially similar to the PSDN, such as Integrated Services Digital Network (ISDN) and the digital subscriber line (DSL) technologies, they are not examples of it. ISDN utilizes the PSTN circuit-switched network, and DSL uses point-to-point circuit switching communications overlaid on the PSTN local loop (copper wires), usually utilized for access to a packet-switched broadband IP network.

Public data transmission service 
A public data transmission service is a data transmission service that is established and operated by a telecommunication administration, or a recognized private operating agency, and uses a public data network. A public data transmission service may include Circuit Switched Data packet-switched, and leased line data transmission.

See also
History of the Internet
International Networking Working Group
National research and education network
Protocol Wars
OSI model
X.25 § History

References

Further reading

 

Telecommunications
Data network
X.25